The 1999 Amstel Gold Race was the 34th edition of the annual road bicycle race "Amstel Gold Race", held on Sunday April 24, 1999, in the Dutch province of Limburg. The race stretched 253 kilometres, with the start and finish in Maastricht. There were a total of 190 competitors, with 84 cyclists finishing the race.

Result

External links
Results

Amstel Gold Race
1999 in Dutch sport
1999 in road cycling
Amstel Gold Race
April 1999 sports events in Europe